Quekett is a surname. It may refer to:

 Edwin John Quekett (1808–1847), English botanist, histologist, and microscopist, brother of John Thomas and William Quekett
 John Frederick Whitlie Quekett (1849-1913) - English born South African conchologist and museum curator, son of John Thomas Quekett
 John Thomas Quekett (1815–1861), English microscopist and histologist, brother of Edwin John and William Quekett
 William Quekett (1802–1888), English rector of Warrington, Lancashire, brother of Edwin John and John Thomas Quekett

See also
 Quekett Microscopical Club, named for John Thomas Quekett
Quekettia (disambiguation)